William Dunlop may refer to:
 William Dunlop (ecclesiastical historian) (1692–1720), British professor of church history at the University of Edinburgh
 William Dunlop (motorcycle racer) (1985–2018), British motorcycle racer
 William Dunlop (principal) (1654–1700), Covenanter and principal of Glasgow University
 William James Dunlop (1881–1960), Ontario MPP and cabinet minister
 William "Tiger" Dunlop (1792–1848), Member of Parliament for United Province of Canada and Warden of the Forests, Canada Company
 William Patterson Dunlop (1951–2009), Canadian actor
 William Vincent "Billy" Dunlop, convicted murderer who was the first person to be convicted under the new UK double jeopardy laws

See also
 Billy Dunlop (footballer, born 1874) (1874–1941), Scottish international footballer who played for Liverpool
 Billy Dunlop (Sunderland footballer) (1869–1960), Scottish football half-back who played for Sunderland and Rangers in the 1890s
 Billy Dunlop (footballer, born 1926) (1926–1994), Scottish football inside forward who played for various clubs in the 1950s
 Rex Dunlop (William Rex Dunlop, born 1927), Scottish footballer